Agustin Peris de Vargas (1880 – 27 August 1949) was a Spanish sports journalist and pioneer of baseball and football in Catalonia, who held managerial positions in the respective federations.

Apart from playing football and baseball, a sport he practiced until he was over fifty years old, he was also a swimmer and an athlete and worked as a journalist in several publications of his time, including the Spanish newspaper Mundo Deportivo, in which he signed the chronicles under the pseudonym "Strike".

His brothers Joaquín, Lisandro and Enrique were also outstanding sportsmen and leaders.

Sporting career

Pioneering baseball
Born in Cuba to a Valencian father and Asturian mother, he was the second son of seven children, including three brothers, Joaquín, Lisandro and Enrique. He developed a deep interest in Baseball while living in Cuba, so when he came to live in Barcelona, he brought with him his passion for the sport. Peris was thus one of the first practitioners of baseball in Catalonia, not only as a player, but also as a coach, umpire and manager. The four Peris de Vargas brothers were all great athletes, standing out mostly as footballers, but Agustín differs from the other brothers in that, in addition to playing football, he also pioneered baseball in Spain. On 3 February 1901, he participated in the first documented baseball match played in Spain, which was held in the old Sagrada Família field by two teams, the Antiguos and the Modernos (old and new), formed by Cuban and Spanish emigrants who had returned from the Cuban War.

Footballing career
In 1909 he played a few friendlies with Català Sport Club, and on 26 December of the same year, he plays with FC Barcelona in one international friendly against the French club Olympique Cettois, featuring alongside his brother Enrique. This was his second appearance for the Blaugrana club, having already played a friendly with them in the 1906–07 season. In 1910 Agustin takes up the position of treasurer in the newly created Barcelona Baseball Club, and a year later he enters the board of directors of the Catalan Football Federation as treasurer, remaining as such for many years. Also in 1910, he was elected president of Catalá SC, a position he would hold until the club's disappearance at the end of the 1920s.

Philanthropy projects
Despite not being a professional soldier, he collaborated with his brother in various kinds of initiatives. In 1921 he was part of a commission to launch an "Institute of Deformed of the War", which was intended to house those Spanish soldiers in need. He later organized a sports festival to collect
funds in the field of FC Barcelona, donating them to the infantry regiment number 73 of the Battalion of the Badajoz, which had various members who belonged to various football clubs such as FC Güell, FC Barcelona, FC Martinenc, CD Europa and Sporting de Gijón, who all sent him a letter to thank him for the donations.

Sports journalism
Apart from playing football and baseball, a sport he practiced until he was over fifty years old, he was also a swimmer and an athlete and worked as a journalist in several publications of his time, including the Spanish newspaper Mundo Deportivo, in which he signed the chronicles under the pseudonym "Strike". In 1923 he started another chapter of the long controversy about the "Deanery" of football in Barcelona, when he defended the "deanery" of his club, SC Catalá, debating that it had been founded in October, a month earlier than FC Barcelona.

In 1924, Peris was a referee in a boxing match held in the Goula Hall of Sant Feliu de Guixols.

Head of the Catalan Baseball Federation
Agustin was the founder and first president of the Catalan Baseball Federation, a position he held occupy from 1929 to 1939. The four Peris de Vargas brothers held management positions in various associations and federations. The characteristic that defined them the most, especially Agustín and Joaquín, were their authoritarian style, which would cause them more than one problem. Agustín's strong personality caused a split in the Catalan Federation in 1931 and some clubs founded the Official Baseball League, which was run in parallel with Agustin's federation until the end of the Spanish Civil War, having some of the best teams. Agustín Peris de Vargas left his position in 1939 and was replaced at the head of the Catalan Federation by Luis María Jordá.

Later life
After the civil war, Peris de Vargas was appointed Mayor of the Neighborhood of the "Pelayo area", belonging to District V of the city of Barcelona. The headquarters was located in his store, which was now at Calle Tallers, and where they sold gramophones. In 1943, he accepted to
assume the presidency of the College of Referees of the Catalan Federation.

Death
Agustín Peris died in August 1948, at the age of 69. Several leaders linked to football and baseball were present at this funeral, such as FC Barcelona's president, ​​Agustín Montal, and the president of the Spanish RCD, Francisco Sáenz.

References

1880 births
1949 deaths
Spanish footballers
Association football forwards
Footballers from Barcelona
Spanish sports journalists